Batman/Tarzan: Claws of the Cat-woman was a 4 Issue comic book miniseries, published in 1999. It was an "Inter-Company Crossover" between DC Comics and Dark Horse Comics who at that time held the license for Tarzan. It sees Batman, portrayed in his initial 1930s avatar team up with Tarzan/Lord Greystoke who's returned to civilization.
Batman and Tarzan team up to help an African cat-Cult priestess to fight against the mercenary/adventurer 2-Face Dent to stop him from stealing the cult's relics.

Summary

The story is set in 1930s Gotham City. It introduces us to a Batman who's at the dawn of his career. In the memory of his parents Bruce Wayne, has opened a new wing in the Gotham Museum named Thomas and Martha Wayne wing of the Gotham Museum of Natural History. He has also financed an expedition to Africa for an Archeologist named Finnegan Dent with the new wing displaying the artifacts that he'll discover in Africa. Also present at the inauguration is Lord Greystoke (Tarzan) who had travelled to America and eventually Gotham to settle his own personal business. Batman and Tarzan both prowl the night as their habits force them to. Together they catch a thief who is seen trying to steal the relics, who turns out to be Princess Khefretari who belongs to the ancient African City of Mamnon. She has come to return the relics to her city which had been unrightfully stolen by Finnegan Dent. Both Batman and Tarzan feel responsible to correct this wrong and thus team up to punish the evil and return the artifacts to their right place.

Collected editions
The series has been collected into a trade paperback:
 Batman/Tarzan: Claws of the Cat-woman (Dark Horse, August 2000, 96 pages)

See also
 Superman/Tarzan: Sons of the Jungle
 Elseworlds

References

External links

Batman titles
Crossover comics
Intercompany crossovers
Elseworlds titles
Works based on Tarzan